The 2022–23 Cymru Premier (known as the JD Cymru Premier for sponsorship reasons) is the 31st season of the Cymru Premier (formally known as the Welsh Premier League), the highest football league within Wales since its establishment in 1992. The New Saints were the defending champions, and retained the title on 17 March 2023 after a 0–0 draw against Connah's Quay Nomads.

Teams
Twelve teams contest the league – the top ten teams from the previous season, and one team each promoted from the second tier leagues, the Cymru North and Cymru South.

The two bottom placed teams from the 2021–22 season, Cefn Druids and Barry Town United, were relegated to the Cymru North and the Cymru South respectively for the 2022–23 season.

Airbus UK Broughton, winners of the 2021–22 Cymru North were promoted to the league. Due to 2021–22 Cymru South champions Llantwit Major's failure to achieve a tier one licence, runners-up Pontypridd Town were promoted in their place.

Team changes

To Cymru Premier
Promoted from the Cymru North
 Airbus UK Broughton

Promoted from the Cymru South
 Pontypridd Town

From Cymru Premier
Relegated to the Cymru North
 Cefn Druids

Relegated to the Cymru South
 Barry Town United

Stadia and locations

Personnel and kits

Managerial changes

League table

Results

Matches 1–22

Matches 23–32

Top six

Bottom six

Season statistics

Top scorers

Hat-tricks

Notes
(H) – Home team(A) – Away team

Most assists

Monthly awards

References 

Cymru Premier seasons
Wales
1